Paulette Moreno Hjorth (born 12 March 1969) is a former professional tennis player from Hong Kong.

Biography
Moreno was a national champion in Hong Kong at the age of 13 in 1982.

She made her debut for the Hong Kong Fed Cup team in 1985 and won a doubles match against West Germany that year. Another of her doubles wins came against Sweden in 1987, when she and Patricia Hy teamed up to claim the deciding rubber 9–7 in the third set. As a junior she was a finalist in the girls' doubles at the 1987 Wimbledon Championships, where she and Korean Kim Il-Soon lost to Natalia Medvedeva and Natasha Zvereva.

From 1987 to 1991 she competed on the WTA Tour. She appeared twice in the main draw at Wimbledon, both times in mixed doubles, partnering Todd Woodbridge in 1987 and Neil Borwick in 1989. In between she also featured at the 1988 Australian Open and made the second round of the singles, with a win over Marianne van der Torre.

She made her final Fed Cup appearance in 1995 and finished with an 18/17 overall record.

Moreno lived for a while in Melbourne after her tennis career but has since moved to Denmark, where her husband is from. In 2017 she began working as a coach at the Lyngby Tennis Club in Copenhagen.

ITF finals

Doubles: 11 (6–5)

References

External links
 
 
 

1969 births
Living people
Hong Kong female tennis players
Hong Kong emigrants to Denmark